Samantha Shantini Ratnam (born 1977) is an Australian social worker, politician and the current leader of the Victorian Greens. Since October 2017 Ratnam has been a member of the Victorian Legislative Council, representing the Northern Metropolitan Region. Prior to this she was a councillor and mayor for the City of Moreland.

Early life
Born in England and raised in Sri Lanka, Samantha Ratnam and her family left the country after the 'Black July' 1983 riots in Colombo that gave rise to 30-year Sri Lankan Civil War between the government and Liberation Tigers of Tamil Eelam, a Tamil separatist group. The family eventually settled in Australia after spending time in Europe and Canada.

From 1995 to 2001 Samantha Ratnam completed a Bachelor of Arts and a Bachelor of Social Work (Honours) from the University of Melbourne. In 2014, she completed her Doctor of Philosophy, titled 'Young people and global citizenship: New possibilities for civic participation', also from the University of Melbourne.

Ratnam has worked in various roles in assisting migrants and asylum seekers including at the Asylum Seeker Resource Centre, in the fields of drug and alcohol rehabilitation, mental health and international development.

In April 2014, Samantha Ratnam explained in The Indian Sun, an online publication for the Australian-Indian community how she is a product of diaspora and her motivations for entering politics.

Moreland Council
Ratnam first stood for and was elected to the City of Moreland Council for South Ward in 2012 as one of three Ward Councillors. In 2016 she was re-elected with her vote more than doubling to over 55 percent of the ward vote.

In 2015 she was elected by councillors as the first Greens mayor of Moreland for 2016 in a 6 to 5 vote with Independent Councillor Helen Davidson and Socialist Alliance Councillor Sue Bolton supporting her bid for the mayor. Her election as Mayor was even noted in the country of her heritage, Sri Lanka, and by the Indian community in Australia, and in Tamil culture.

In her time on the council, Ratnam was instrumental in removing official council references to Australia Day, saying “this is a gesture of respect and an important step in healing”. Ratnam resigned from the council on 11 October 2017.

2016 Federal election campaign
Ahead of the 2016 federal election the Greens preselected Ratnam to stand in the Division of Wills, where the sitting Labor MP Kelvin Thomson was retiring.

Although Ratnam substantially increased the Greens vote with a swing greater than 10 percentage points in Wills, the Labor candidate Peter Khalil won the seat with a 4.88 point margin.

State politics
Ratnam filled the vacant Legislative Council seat of former Victorian Greens leader Greg Barber, who announced his retirement from politics on 28 September 2017. On 12 October 2017, prior to having officially filled Barber's seat, Ratnam was appointed as leader of the Victorian Greens, becoming the first woman to lead the party at a state level. She was officially sworn in as a member of the Legislative Council on 19 October 2017. 

Ratnam was re-elected in the Northern Metropolitan region at the 2018 state election, though her four party colleagues failed to win back their seats and she became the only Greens member of the Legislative Council.

Tenure 
During her time in state politics, Ratnam has established parliamentary inquiries into the growing threat of far-right extremism (2022), the biodiversity extinction crisis (2019), and the waste and recycling crisis (2019).

According to The Age, between November 2018 and November 2021, Ratnam voted with the Andrews Government's position 62.4% of the time, the fourth-most of any Legislative Council crossbencher.

Academic research
As a social work PhD student, Ratnam contributed to a number of peer-reviewed research papers and academic books, including:
The Nobody's Clients Project: Identifying and Addressing the Needs of Children with Substance Dependent Parents: Full Report – 2004 – Odyssey Institute of Studies  
Identifying Children's Needs When Parents Access Drug Treatment: The Utility of a Brief Screening Measure – 12 October 2008 – Taylor and Francis Online 
Global Connections: ‘A Tool for Active Citizenship’ – 20 October 2009 – Taylor and Francis Online 
Youth-led Learning: Local Connections & Global Citizenship. Australian Youth Research Centre, Melbourne Graduate School of Education, University of Melbourne, 2008 
Chapter 12 Young People and the future in For We Are Young And ...: Young People in a Time of Uncertainty (Book) By Johanna Wyn, Roger Holdsworth, Sally Beadle – Melbourne Univ. Publishing, 15 March 2011 
 Chapter 4 Citizenship beyond status: New paradigms for citizenship education, in Educating for Global Citizenship: A Youth-led Approach to Learning and Partnership by Ani Wierenga, Jose Roberto Guevara. Melbourne Univ. Publishing, 1 February 2013 
Young people and global citizenship: new possibilities for civic participation. 2015 (PhD thesis)

References

External links
2016 Council Candidate website
Samantha Ratnam launches the Australian Greens #Wills2016 election campaign #ausvotes – YouTube video
An interview with Cr Samantha Ratnam, Moreland Mayor 2015–16 – YouTube video

Australian Greens members of the Parliament of Victoria
Members of the Victorian Legislative Council
1977 births
Living people
Australian social workers
Politicians from Melbourne
Mayors of places in Victoria (Australia)
University of Melbourne alumni
University of Melbourne women
Sri Lankan emigrants to Australia
Sri Lankan emigrants to Canada
English people of Sri Lankan Tamil descent
Australian people of Sri Lankan Tamil descent
Women members of the Victorian Legislative Council
Women mayors of places in Victoria (Australia)
21st-century Australian politicians
21st-century Australian women politicians